Koruluk Dam is a dam in Gümüşhane Province, Turkey, built between 1990 and 2001. It therefore holds back water from flooding the lands. The development was backed by the Turkish State Hydraulic Works.

See also
List of dams and reservoirs in Turkey

External links
DSI directory, State Hydraulic Works (Turkey), Retrieved December 16, 2009

Dams in Gümüşhane Province